Gisel (also Romanized as Gīsel and Gisal; also known as Kīseh and Kīsel) is a village in Deylaman Rural District, Deylaman District, Siahkal County, Gilan Province, Iran. At the 2006 census, its population was 114, in 30 families.

References 

Populated places in Siahkal County